Bart–Pumphrey syndrome (also known as "Palmoplantar keratoderma with knuckle pads and leukonychia and deafness") is a cutaneous condition characterized by hyperkeratoses (knuckle pads) over the metacarpophalangeal, proximal and distal interphalangeal joints.

It was characterized in 1967.

It can be associated with GJB2.

See also 
 Camisa disease
 List of cutaneous conditions
 Bart syndrome
 Palmoplantar keratoderma

References

External links 

Palmoplantar keratodermas
Syndromes